Sándor Kányádi (10 May 1929 – 20 June 2018) was a Hungarian poet and translator from the region of Transylvania, Romania. He was one of the most famous and beloved contemporary Hungarian poets. He was a major contributor to Hungarian children's literature. His works have been translated into English, Finnish, Estonian, Swedish, German, French, Romanian and Portuguese.

Biography
He was born in Porumbenii Mari (Hungarian: Nagygalambfalva), a small Hungarian village in the region of Transylvania, to a family of Hungarian farmers. He was educated in the nearby town of Odorheiu-Secuiesc (Hungarian: Székelyudvarhely). Present-day Tamási Áron Gimnázium was his alma mater. He moved to Cluj in 1950. Nowadays, he split his time between Budapest and his cottage in the Transylvanian countryside.

Kányádi graduated from Bolyai University (before Bolyai University was forced to merge with the Romanian university to form present-day Babes-Bolyai University) with a teacher's qualification and degree in Hungarian language and literature. He published his first volume of poetry in 1955 while an assistant editor and frequent contributor to several literary magazines, including poems in children's magazines that are still very popular today. His translations are also very popular and include Saxon and Yiddish folk poetry, contemporary Romanian poetry, and major German and French poets. He also gave several literary talks abroad during the 1960s and 1970s to Hungarian communities in Western Europe, Scandinavia, North America, and South America.

He was active in political issues throughout the years, as shown in his numerous works relating to the oppression of the Transylvanian Hungarian minority. In 1987, the Romanian Communist government refused him a passport to visit an international poets' conference in Rotterdam, which resulted in his resignation from the Romanian Writers' Union out of protest.

Awards

He garnered more than 30 awards and honors, among others:
Kossuth Prize, Budapest, 1993
 Poetry Prize of the Romanian Writers' Union
Herder Prize in Vienna in 1995,
 Central European Time Millennium Prize, 2000

References

External links
Dancing Embers, a selection of poetry in English translation
Travis Jeppesen on Kanyadi's Dancing Embers

1929 births
2018 deaths
20th-century Hungarian poets
Babeș-Bolyai University alumni
People from Harghita County
20th-century Romanian poets
Hungarian translators
Recipients of the Order of the Cross of Terra Mariana, 5th Class
Hungarian children's writers
20th-century translators
Hungarian male poets
Herder Prize recipients
20th-century Romanian male writers
20th-century Hungarian male writers
Romanian people of Hungarian descent